Vijayanagar, meaning City of Victory, may refer to:

Places

India 
Vijayanagara Empire (or Karnata Empire), of Southern India, 14th-17th centuries A.D.
Vijayanagara, now-ruined capital city of the Vijayanagara Empire
Vijayanagara metropolitan area
Vijayanagara (Karnataka Assembly constituency), Assembly constituency in Karnataka, India
Vijayanagar, Bangalore, neighborhood in Bangalore, Karnataka, India
Vijay Nagar (Vidhana Sabha constituency), Assembly constituency
Vijayanagar, Mysore, neighbourhood in Mysore, Karnataka, India
Vijayanagar, Belgaum, a small village in Belgaum District, Karnataka
Vijayanagar, Hubli, neighbourhood in Hubli, Karnataka, India
Vijayanagar, Davanagere, neighbourhood in Davanagere, Karnataka, India
Vijayanagar, Chitradurga, neighbourhood in Chitradurga, Karnataka, India
Vijayanagar, Hassan, neighbourhood in Hassan, Karnataka, India
VIjayanagar, Arasikere, village in Arasikere Taluk, Hassan, Karnataka, India
VIjayanagar, Belagavi, village in Chikkodi Taluk, Belagavi, Karnataka, India
VIjayanagar, Indi, village in Indi Taluk, Vijayapura district, Karnataka, India
VIjayanagar, Muddebihal, village in Muddebihal Taluk, Vijayapura district, Karnataka, India
VIjayanagar, Bidar, village in Aurad Taluk, Bidar, Karnataka, India
VIjaynagar, Kalaburagi, village in Aland Taluk, Kalaburagi, Karnataka, India
Vijay Nagar, Ghaziabad, neighbourhood in Ghaziabad District, Uttar Pradesh
Vijayanagar, Hyderabad, neighbourhood in Hyderabad, Telangana
Vijaynagar, Changlang, a tehsil in Changlang district of Arunachal Pradesh
Vijaynagar tehsil, in Srigangagnagar district of Rajasthan
VIjaynagar, Sangli, neighbourhood in Sangli, Maharashtra, India
VIjaynagar, Miraj, village in Miraj Taluka, Sangli, Maharashtra, India
Vijay Nagar, Indore, neighbourhood in Indore city, Madhya Pradesh
Vizianagaram, Andhra Pradesh, also known as Vijayanagaram
Vizianagaram district, Andhra Pradesh
Vijaynagar State, a princely state in Gujarat
Vijaynagar taluka, a taluka in Gujarat
Vijoy Nagar, a village in Nicobar district

Nepal 
Bijaya Nagar, a V.D.C. in Pyuthan District

See also 
Vijaya (disambiguation)